Howlin' at the Halloween Moon is a live album by The Del-Lords, released in 1989 through Restless Records.

Track listing
All songs written by Scott Kempner, except "Jumpin' in the Night" by Cyril Jordan and Chris Wilson and "Tallahassee Lassie" by Bob Crewe, Frank Slay, and Frederick Picariello.

Personnel 
The Del-Lords
Scott Kempner – lead vocals, guitar
Eric Ambel – guitar, vocals
Manny Caiati – bass guitar, vocals
Frank Funaro – drums, vocals

References 

1989 live albums
The Del-Lords albums
Restless Records live albums